Stauder v City of Ulm (1969) Case 29/69 is an EU law case, concerning the protection of human rights in the European Union.

Facts
An EU scheme provided cheap butter for welfare benefits, but required to show a coupon with a person’s name and address. Mr Stauder claimed this violated his dignity and challenged it.

Judgment
The Court of Justice held that properly interpreted, the measure did not require a name to be shown on the coupon. In doing so it acknowledged that human rights formed part of unwritten general principles of EU law:

See also

European Union law
Internationale Handelsgesellschaft mbH v Einfuhr- und Vorratsstelle für Getreide und Futtermittel (1970), another landmark case concerning the protection of fundamental rights in the European Union
Streisand effect

Court of Justice of the European Union case law